is a racing game released in 1999 in Japan for the Nintendo 64. It is the sequel to Choro Q 64 (Penny Racers outside Japan) and is part of the Choro Q series. The game is also compatible with the Game Boy Color game Choro Q Hyper Customable GB, using the GB Transfer Pak.

References

1999 video games
Games with Transfer Pak support
Japan-exclusive video games
Nintendo 64 games
Nintendo 64-only games
Racing video games
Video games based on Takara Tomy toys
Video games developed in Japan